Landmark Hotel is a purpose-built, privately owned and professionally managed hotel in Rivers State, Nigeria. The hotel is located at 4 Worlu Street in D-line neighborhood of Port Harcourt. The hotel covers an area of approximately 20,000 square metres. The hotel has 112 rooms, 3 suites, a restaurant, bar, gym and conference facilities which accommodate up to 250 people.

It is owned by Eleme businessman Olaka Nwogu.

References

External links

Buildings and structures in Port Harcourt (local government area)
D-line, Port Harcourt
Buildings and structures in Port Harcourt
Hotels in Nigeria
Tourism in Port Harcourt